Byron Bay AFL Football Club, also known as the Byron Bay Magpies, is a Byron Bay, New South Wales based club competing in the QAFA Northern Rivers competition. It was founded in 1984.

Formed in 1984 the Magpies played in the Summerland AFL until it was merged into the Queensland State League in 2011.

From 2012 the club will played in the SEQAFL Division 4 South/Northern Rivers league.

In 2014 the club joined and played in the QAFA (Northern Rivers) league where it remains.

Premierships
Summerland Australian Football League and QAFA (Northern Rivers):
 1985, 1992, 1993, 1994, 1999, 2000, 2001, 2003, 2004, 2007, 2008, 2009, 2016 
2016 Premiership side:

B. Shane Morritt. Daniel Tiffin. Andrew Fyffe.

HB. Jackson Coppin. Sam Mitchell. Sam Dennis.

C. Zac Sullivan. Rhys Lavery. Gus Staley.

HF. Will McBride. Zeke Hower. Alex Margan.

F. Ryan McMillan. Kieran Atkin. Brett Porter.

R. Sam Buultjens. Nathan Moon. David Smith.

Int. Ian Dock. Crispin Myres. Kalani Fallon. Heath Griggs.

See also
AFL NSW/ACT
Australian rules football in New South Wales
http://www.australianrulesfootball.com.au/pages/ByronFC
http://websites.sportstg.com/team_info.cgi?id=20492544&client=1-109-124608-407179-20492544&compID=407179

References

External links

Australian rules football clubs in New South Wales
Australian rules football clubs in Queensland
1984 establishments in Australia
Australian rules football clubs established in 1984
Byron Bay, New South Wales